Al-Nayrab is a town in Syria, to the south-east of the city of Aleppo in northern Syria. With the urban development, the village was gradually absorbed by the city of Aleppo thus becoming part of it as a district.

Al-Nayrab is also an important archaeological site, having been excavated in 1926–27 by Augustin-Georges Barrois and Bertrand Carrière.

Etymology
Nayrab or Neyrab is the Syriac word for a flat land or water through the valley.

History
Salih ibn Ali ibn Abdullah ibn Abbas, the Abbasid governor of Bilad al-Sham (Syria), built the Bttiyas Palace on the hill of Nayrab.

Al-Nayrab was a village southeast of Aleppo, with the urbanization of the city have been included Nayrab. And is not located only 10 kilometers from the city center and the fact that the land was lying established by the French military airport, and after the independence was that the airport expansion to include airport and other civilian and military is known as  Nayrab Airport and has turned his name now to Aleppo International Airport. According to the Syria Central Bureau of Statistics, Deir Jamal had a population of 10,018 in the 2004 census.

After the 1948 war, Palestinians migrated to the neighboring countries which have been receiving several thousand of them and landed in the barracks near the airport that had been brought by the French army to its soldiers and called the place then Nayrab camp for Palestinians refugees.

Economy
The plains of Nayrab are fertile plains where various types of vegetables are grown, in particular cucumbers. Nayrab produces reasonable quantities of olive and pistachio, and Damask rose, domestically known as "Ward Al-Jouri", which is the first product of Nayrab and exported to several countries where they are used in the manufacture of perfumes and is essentially in the installation of some medicines, foods and beverages.

See also
Bab al-Nairab
Neirab steles
Euphrates Syrian Pillar Figurines
Euphrates Handmade Syrian Horses and Riders

Bibliography

 Augustin-Georges Barrois and B. Carrière, Fouilles de l'école archéologique française de Jérusalem effectuées à Neirab du 24 septembre au 5 novembre 1926, pages 126-142, dans Syria, 1927, volume 8,  (online)
 Augustin-Georges Barrois and B. Carrière, Fouilles de l'école archéologique française de Jérusalem, effectuées à Neirab du 24 septembre au 5 novembre 1926, pages 201-212, dans Syria, 1927, volume 8,  (online) 
 Augustin-Georges Barrois and M. Abel, Fouilles de l'école archéologique française de Jérusalem , effectuées à Neirab du 12 septembre au 6 novembre 1927, pages 187-206, dans Syria, 1928, volume 9,  (online) 
 Augustin-Georges Barrois and M. Abel, Fouilles de l'école archéologique française de Jérusalem , effectuées à Neirab du 12 septembre au 6 novembre 1927, pages 303-319, dans Syria, 1928, volume 9,  (online)

References

External links
 Nayrab Web Site on the Internet(only in Arabic)
Neirab, articles from UNWRA

Aleppo
Neighborhoods of Aleppo
Archaeological sites in Syria